The 1934 season of the Mitropa Cup football club tournament was won by AGC Bologna who defeated Admira Wien 7–4 on aggregate in the final. It was Bologna's second victory in the competition, having won it previously in 1932. The two legs of the final were played on 5 September and 9 September.

This was the eighth edition of the tournament. Holders FK Austria Wien were eliminated in the first round

First round

|}

Play-offs

|}
a Match decided by play off.
b Match decided by coin toss.

* The original play off between Budapest and Sparta; (Sparta 5 Hungária MTK 2), was declared void, as well as the original home and away matches (Hungária MTK 4 Sparta 5; Sparta 1 Hungária MTK 2), due to Sparta having fielded an ineligible player. The tie was subsequently played from the beginning.

Quarterfinals

|}

Semifinals

|}

Finals

|}

Top goalscorers

External links

References

1934-35
1934–35 in European football
1934–35 in Austrian football
1934–35 in Italian football
1934–35 in Czechoslovak football
1934–35 in Hungarian football